Blacc Plague is the second studio album by American hip hop group Insane Poetry. At the time of release, front man Psycho changed the spelling of his name to Cyco. In 2008, after acquiring the rights, the group re-released the album with several bonus tracks on its own Grim Reality Entertainment label.

Track listing

2008 track listing
 Deadly Virus—(1:22)
Wrong Neck of the Woods—(4:14)
Who Runs the Mothafucka—(3:55)
You better Ask Somebody—(4:06)
On Deadly Ground—(3:12)
Niggaz Only Live to Die—(3:01)
Home of the Bodybagz—(3:31)
Killa Instincts—(3:45)
In the Mouth of Madness—(4:36)
Mirror, Mirror—(3:46)
How the Wickit Kickit—(3:31)
City of the Damned (Remix)—(2:06)

Samples
How the Wicked Kickit
"Papa Was Too" by Joe Tex
In the Mouth of Maddness
"B Side Wins Again" by Public Enemy
Who Runs the Mutha F***A
"Funky Worm" by Ohio Players
"More Bounce to the Ounce" by Zapp

1996 albums
Insane Poetry albums
Horrorcore albums